USS Charles R. Ware (DE-547) was a proposed World War II United States Navy John C. Butler-class destroyer escort that was never built.

Charles R. Ware was planned to be built at the Boston Navy Yard in Boston, Massachusetts. Her construction contract was cancelled in 1944 before her construction could begin.

The name Charles R. Ware was reassigned to the destroyer USS Charles R. Ware (DD-865).

References

Navsource Naval History: Photographic History of the U.S. Navy: Destroyer Escorts, Frigates, Littoral Warfare Vessels

John C. Butler-class destroyer escorts
Cancelled ships of the United States Navy